Joke Bruijs (born 14 January 1952) is a Dutch actress, singer and cabaret artist. She sang with big bands, recorded songs and appeared in films and a Dutch TV soap. She has been called the "First Lady of Rotterdam".

Life

Bruijs was born in Rotterdam in 1952 into a musical family. In 1966 she joined a pop group named the "Spitfires" who were based in her home city.

Her cabaret work has included work with "Mini & Maxi" and the Dutch comedian André van Duin.

In 1970 she competed in the National Song Contest where she came fourth with a song called "Okido". The winner of the contest, Hearts of Soul, went on to unsuccesffuly compete in the Eurovision Song Contest.

She worked with singer Gerard Cox and they married each other.

In 2003 she was given an Erasus Pin by her home city.

In 2009 she first appeared in the long running Dutch soap Goede tijden, slechte tijden. She was in the soap again in 2010 and a bit in 2011. On screen she plays the mother of characters Rik and Danny de Jong before her character left for Canada. Her character returned to the story in 2018.

When she had been appearing for fifty years in 2017 she was given a celebration. On 7 May there was a concert featuring North Sea Symphonic Bigbad Orchestra to honour the "first lady of Rotterdam". The concert was held at De Doelen. She did a tour with The Ramblers whom she had sang with in the 60s when they featured on Dutch radio.

In 2020, she was involved with a film which also starred her former spouse, Gerard Cox.  In 2022, they starred in the film Casa Coco.

Private life
She was married to the singer Gerard Cox and they remained good friends.

Since about 2003 she has been in a relationship with the musician Frits Landesbergen. They made an album together and his marriage was ending and her marriage to Boris Beyer had ended. Landesbergen is younger by eleven years. They have a second home on the Dutch Caribbean island of Bonaire.

References

1952 births
Living people
People from Rotterdam
20th-century Dutch comedians
21st-century Dutch comedians
Dutch actors
Dutch singers